Serwekai is a town, tehsil, and subdivision of South Waziristan in the Federally Administered Tribal Areas of Pakistan. Serwekai is one of the three subdivisions of South Waziristan, along with Ladha and Wanna. The subdivision of Serwekai is further divided into two Tehsils: Serwekai and Tiarza.

Notable people
Manzoor Pashteen, human rights activist and founder of the Pashtun Tahafuz Movement

See also
Manzoor Pashteen
Pashtun Tahafuz Movement
Waziristan Education City at Serwekai

References

Populated places in South Waziristan